Leo Stodolsky is the former director of the Max Planck Institute for Physics.

References

Living people
University of Chicago alumni
Max Planck Society people
Year of birth missing (living people)
American physicists
Place of birth missing (living people)
Max Planck Institute directors